Saint-Martin-Boulogne is a commune in the Pas-de-Calais department in the Hauts-de-France region of France.

Geography
Saint-Martin-Boulogne is a farming and light industrial suburb east of Boulogne itself, at the junction of the N42 and D96 roads. Junctions 30 and 31 of the A16 autoroute lie within the commune's borders.

Population

Places of interest
 The church of St.Martin, dating from the eighteenth century.
 The modern church of Sts.Bernadette and Yde.
 The Château de La Caucherie, dating from the nineteenth century.
 The Château du Denacre, dating from the eighteenth century.
 Three 17th century farmhouses and manorhouses.
 A fifteenth century windmill and the ruins of a watermill.
 The Meerut Military Cemetery (Commonwealth War Graves Commission cemetery).

See also
Communes of the Pas-de-Calais department

References

External links

 Official town website 
 The CWGC cemetery
 The Meerut Military Cemetery on the website "Remembrance Trails of the Great War in Northern France"

Saintmartinboulogne